The House of Sagredo was an aristocratic Venetian family that gave rise to one doge.

Notable members 
Nicolò Sagredo  - Ambassador and Doge of the Republic
Giovanni Francesco Sagredo - Mathematician and friend of Galileo
Zaccaria Sagredo - Patron of arts in Venice
Caterina Sagredo Barbarigo - 18th century Casino owner

Palace 
Ca' Sagredo - Palace on the Grand Canal of Venice
Sagredo Chapel in San Francesco della Vigna

References